Chrysopoloma is a genus of moths in the family Chrysopolominae. It is the type genus in the family.

List of species 

 Chrysopoloma bicolor
 Chrysopoloma citrina
 Chrysopoloma crawshayi
 Chrysopoloma flaviceps
 Chrysopoloma flavipennis
 Chrysopoloma flavoantennata
 Chrysopoloma isabellina
 Chrysopoloma nigrociliata
 Chrysopoloma nigromaculata
 Chrysopoloma nubila
 Chrysopoloma occidens
 Chrysopoloma opalina
 Chrysopoloma pallens
 Chrysopoloma paupera
 Chrysopoloma restricta
 Chrysopoloma rosea
 Chrysopoloma rudis
 Chrysopoloma similis
 Chrysopoloma varia
 Chrysopoloma variegata
 Chrysopoloma zernyi

References 

Chrysopolominae